Fauna of Malta may refer to:

 List of birds of Malta
 List of mammals of Malta

See also
 Outline of Malta